Eurois is a genus of moths of the family Noctuidae first described by Jacob Hübner in 1821.

Description
Its eyes are naked and without eyelashes. The proboscis is well developed. Palpi upturned, reaching vertex of head, and smoothly scaled. Thorax with a small furrowed tuft beyond collar and a pair of tufts on metathorax. Abdomen tuftless, where the dorsal part of proximal segments clothed with coarse hair. Tibia spineless. Forewings with crenulate cilia.

Species
Eurois astricta Morrison, 1874
Eurois inclusa Walker, 1865
Eurois nigra Smith, 1892
Eurois occulta (Linnaeus, 1758)
Eurois repugnans Walker, 1857
Eurois retrahens Walker, 1856

Eurois praefixa is now known as Richia praefixa. Eurois docilis (Grote, 1881) is considered a synonym of Richia praefixa.

References

Noctuinae